Harrisburg Avenue Tobacco Historic District is a historic tobacco warehouse complex and national historic district located at Lancaster, Lancaster County, Pennsylvania. It includes four contributing buildings built between 1874 and about 1881. All four buildings are brick buildings used for the processing and storage of cigar leaf tobacco.  Two of the four buildings were built in 1874 and known as the C. August Bitner Tobacco Warehouse, the third was built about 1880 as the Pritzfield & Co. Tobacco Warehouse, and the fourth was built about 1881 as the Rosenbaum Tobacco Warehouse.  The Rosenbaum Tobacco Warehouse is now occupied by the Lancaster Arts Hotel.

It was listed on the National Register of Historic Places in 1990.

References

External links
Lancaster Arts Hotel website

Industrial buildings and structures on the National Register of Historic Places in Pennsylvania
Historic districts on the National Register of Historic Places in Pennsylvania
Buildings and structures in Lancaster, Pennsylvania
Historic districts in Lancaster County, Pennsylvania
Tobacco buildings in the United States
National Register of Historic Places in Lancaster, Pennsylvania